Lycée Al-Horreya may refer to:
 Lycée La Liberté Héliopolis, a French-language school in Cairo
 Lycée Français d'Alexandrie, a French-language school in Alexandria